The Homeless Gospel Choir, also known as Derek Zanetti, is a folk-punk musician from Pittsburgh, Pennsylvania. He is signed to A-F Records and has released seven albums to date. His debut album, Some People Never Go Anywhere, was released in 2010, You Work So Hard to Be Like Everyone Else, in 2011, Luxury Problems, his third was released in 2012; and his fourth album, I Used To Be So Young, which was released in 2014, contains his hit song, "Untitled". Most of his songs revolve around the topics of politics and mental health.

Discography
Some People Never Go Anywhere (2010)
You Work So Hard Just to Be Like Everyone Else (2011)
Luxury Problems (2012)
I Used To Be So Young (2014)
Normal (2017)
This Land Is Your Landfill (2020)
Fourth Dimension Intervention (2022)

References

External links 
 Website of The Homeless Gospel Choir
I Used to Be So Young Review, Punknews.org
The Homeless Gospel Choir – ‘I Used To Be So Young’ album stream, Alternative Press
Presents: Normal Review, Hectic Eclectic Music Reviews

Musicians from Pittsburgh
Living people
Folk punk musicians
Year of birth missing (living people)